

Airmobile Operations Division (Division Luftbewegliche Operationen) was a division of the German Army. The division was founded on 1 July 2002 and reported for duty 8 October 2002. Airmobile Operations Division consisted of approximately 14,500 soldiers, 350 of which were stationed at divisionary headquarters in Veitshöchheim, Germany.

In October 2011 the German Federal Ministry of Defence announced a reorganisation/reduction of the German Armed Forces. As a consequence, Airmobile Operations Division was dissolved and those units not being disbanded altogether were either transferred to other parts of the armed forces or incorporated into a different command structure. The division itself was officially disbanded on 26 June 2014 and was integrated into the 10th Armoured Division which relocated from Sigmaringen to Veitshöchheim.

Tasks 
The tasks of the division were unique within the modern German military in that it was able to provide air mobility as well as ground-based fire support, aerial defence and counter chemical, biological, radiological, and nuclear assets to all parts of the German military. With an additional infantry component, it was also capable of limited air assault operations. The division's command was prepared to fulfil a role as Framework Headquarters for NATO and EU operations. Troops of Airmobile Operations Division also render assistance to civilian authorities during disaster relief operations.

Coat of arms and motto 
The coat of arms of Airmobile Operations Division depicts a flying black eagle, with its wings turned upright, holding a sword in its claws on a argent. Below the eagle a red arrow is shown. The argent symbolises dedication and the eagle strength, courage and bravery. The eagle's upturned wings, somewhat unusual in heraldry, represent the lunging out for new power. The sword stands for strike capability and penetration depth. The red arrow illustrates the third dimension, the depth of space and the dynamics of the division. The framing silver cord shows the status as a division. The maroon coloured seam corresponds with the traditional beret colour of the Army Aviation Corps and airborne forces.

The division's motto was the same as the German Army Aviation Corps': Nach vorn! which translates as either "Forward!" or "To the front!".

Deployment 
Units of Airmobile Operations Division were deployed in a number of missions under the aegis of either the United Nations, the European Union or NATO.
 SFOR in Bosnia and Herzegovina (ended 2003)
 KFOR (ended 2003)
 Disaster relief following the earthquake in Kashmir, Pakistan (2005-2006))
 EUFOR RD Congo in the Democratic Republic of the Congo (2006)
 ISAF in Afghanistan (from 2002)

Structure 
Airmobile Operations Division's staff was based at Veitshöchheim. The division incorporated units from various branches of the German Army. These units were stationed all over Southern and Central parts of Germany.

The following units were directly subordinate to Airmobile Operations Division:

The following units were subordinate to Airmobile Brigade 1:

Commanders

Equipment

Armoured Vehicles 
 Light air-transportable armoured fighting vehicle Wiesel 1 and Wiesel 2
 Air-transportable, armoured multirole transport vehicle Mungo
 Anti-aircraft cannon tank Gepard
 Surface-to-air missile light armoured tank Ozelot
 Armoured Howitzer 2000

Helicopters 
 Light transport helicopter Bell UH-1D
 Medium transport helicopter Sikorsky CH-53 G/GS
 Light anti-tank helicopter Bo 105P/PAH-1A1
 Light liaison- and reconnaissance helicopter Bo 105 P1M
 Attack helicopter Tiger
 Medium transport helicopter NH-90

References

Further reading

See also
 Bundeswehr
 German Army

Military units and formations established in 2002
German army aviation
Divisions of the Bundeswehr
Airborne divisions of Germany
2002 establishments in Germany
Military units and formations disestablished in 2014